Nobat is a Gujarati language daily newspaper published in Jamnagar, Gujarat, India.

References

External links
Official website

Gujarati-language newspapers published in India
Publications with year of establishment missing